Counterslip Baptist Church is a church located in south Bristol, England. It has been located on its current site on the Wells Road since the 1950s having previously been located on Counterslip near Bristol Bridge.

The church was founded in 1804 when 49 members of the declining Pithay Church left and decided to set up a church of their own at Tailor's Court. The first service was held on 12 November that year. By 1810, numbers at the church had risen to around 70. It was then that the church moved to Counterslip and acquired the name that it is still known by today.

By 1822, membership at the church had risen to well over 200. By the mid-1870s, membership had risen to around 500 causing the church to move again, this time to Victoria Street where a chapel was built which was used until the 1940s when it was bombed during the Second World War. The Church used several temporary venues before it moved to the Hengrove Hall in Whitchurch (now the Kingdom Hall used by the Jehovah's Witnesses). In 1948, the church moved to the current Wells Road site where two temporary buildings had been erected, a main church building and a hall. In 1957, work began on the premises that the church still uses today which opened on 28 June.

Football
Counterslip Baptist Church FC has played in the Premier Division of the Bristol Churches Football League.

The ministers of Counterslip Baptist Church 
1804-1810 Rev. H. Perkins
1811-1822 Rev. John Holloway
1823-1860 Rev. Thomas Winter
1862-1872 Rev. R. P. Macmaster
1874-1883 Rev. R. W. Skerry
1883-1900 Rev. Henry Knee
1901-1907 Rev. F. Thompson Smyth
1908-1917 Rev. J. Howell Rees
1918-1925 Rev. E. W. Probert
1925-1938 Rev. A. Glen Smith
1939-1943 Rev. W. Hogan
1944-1946 Rev. John R. P. S. Wills
1947-1952 Rev. S. Marlow
1953-1963 Rev. T. Roy Jones
1965-1971 Rev. W. F. Bacon
1974-1977 Rev. T. C. Bailey
1978-1989 Rev. David B. Hewitt
1991-1999 Rev. Nigel Coles
1999-2004 Rev. Dr Simon Woodman
2002-2018 Rev. Ian Sinclair
2003-2019 Rev. Mark Godbeer
2009-2015 Rev. Kath Wilson (Youth Minister)
2019-Pres Matt Caddick (2016-2019 as Youth Minister)
2020-Pres Jacob Whatling (Youth Minister)

External links
 Counterslip Baptist Church Official Website

Baptist churches in Bristol
Religious organizations established in 1804
1804 establishments in England
Churches bombed by the Luftwaffe in Bristol